Fairmont Normal School Administration Building is a historic school building located on the campus of Fairmont State University at Fairmont, Marion County, West Virginia.  It was built between 1915 and 1917, and is a large three-story Classical Revival style building sited atop a hill overlooking Locust Avenue. Its light coated brick exterior walls are ornamented with limestone and terra cotta details.  Its front features a portico with eight Ionic order columns with shafts made of Indiana Blue Limestone.  The original building measured 265 feet by 65 feet; the west wing was added in 1927.

The building was renamed Hardway Hall in 1989 for Wendell G. Hardway, a former president of Fairmont State College.  It was listed on the National Register of Historic Places in 1994.

References

School buildings completed in 1917
Buildings and structures in Marion County, West Virginia
Neoclassical architecture in West Virginia
Fairmont State University
University and college buildings on the National Register of Historic Places in West Virginia
National Register of Historic Places in Marion County, West Virginia
1917 establishments in West Virginia